The Usme Fault is a dextral oblique normal fault in the department of Cundinamarca in central Colombia.

Etymology 
The fault is named after Usme, southern locality of the Colombian capital Bogotá.

Description 
The Usme Fault is located in the Eastern Ranges of the Colombian Andes, south of Bogotá and extends along the western margin of the Tunjuelo River valley. The fault underlies the Sumapaz Páramo. The fault displaces Cretaceous and Tertiary rocks as well as Quaternary alluvial and glacial (moraine) deposits.

The fault valley shows features suggesting a half-graben with a steep slope wall on the west and low-angle slope on the east. The hanging valleys have Quaternary alluvial deposits on the western uplifted block. The scarp forms the western wall of a narrow and long valley.

See also 

 List of earthquakes in Colombia
 Bogotá Fault
 Vianí Fault
 Eastern Frontal Fault System

References

Bibliography

Maps 
 

Seismic faults of Colombia
Normal faults
Strike-slip faults
Active faults
Faults
Faults
Earthquakes in Colombia
Muysccubun